The 2022 America East Conference baseball tournament will be held from May 25 to 28, 2022. The top six teams out of the league's seven members will meet in the double-elimination tournament held at Mahaney Diamond in Orono, Maine, the home park of Maine. The tournament champion will receive the conference's automatic bid into the 2022 NCAA Division I baseball tournament.

Seeding and format
The top six teams from the regular season are seeded one through six based on conference winning percentage only. The two division winners receive a first-round bye. The teams then play a double-elimination tournament.  Stony Brook is ineligible, as they will depart the America East Conference after the 2022 season.

Bracket

References

Tournament
America East Conference Baseball Tournament
America East Conference baseball tournament
College sports tournaments in Maine
Baseball competitions in Maine
Sports in Orono, Maine